Clinton Wines (2 May 1922 – 23 October 2006) was an Australian rules footballer who played with Carlton in the Victorian Football League (VFL) during the mid-1940s.

While at Carlton, Wines played as a centreman and it was in that position that he starred against Herbie Matthews in the 1945 VFL Grand Final win over South Melbourne. Wines, who was originally from South Warrnambool, had served with the 2/23rd Battalion in North Africa before joining Carlton.

The next stage of his career was spent in Sydney, where he had gone because his wife was home sick. He was signed up by Eastern Suburbs where he would play often as a forward, topping their goal-kicking twice, including an 81-goal season in 1949. On one occasion, in 1950, he kicked 19 goals in a match against Illawarra. Wines also captain-coached Eastern Suburbs for a time and captained NSW at interstate football.

Wines moved to Ganmain as a school teacher and coach them in 1952, 1953 and 1955, leading them to the 1953 South West Football League (New South Wales) premiership and kicking over 100 goals in 1953 too.

He then coached Grong Grong Matong in the South West Football League (New South Wales) from 1956 to 1958 and went onto play over 100 games with them.

References

Holmesby, Russell and Main, Jim (2007). The Encyclopedia of AFL Footballers. 7th ed. Melbourne: Bas Publishing.

1922 births
2006 deaths
Australian rules footballers from Victoria (Australia)
Carlton Football Club players
Carlton Football Club Premiership players
South Warrnambool Football Club players
East Sydney Australian Football Club players
Australian Army personnel of World War II
Australian Army soldiers
Royal Australian Air Force personnel of World War II
Royal Australian Air Force airmen
One-time VFL/AFL Premiership players
Military personnel from Victoria (Australia)